Raymond James Martin (born August 8, 1941) is a politician in Alberta, Canada and former member of the Legislative Assembly of Alberta.

Martin served four terms as an Alberta MLA and two terms as an Edmonton Public School Board Trustee. In 2018, Martin published his memoir, "Made in Alberta: The Ray Martin Story".

Early life 

Born in 1941 in Delia, Alberta, Martin attended the University of Alberta in Edmonton. He was a member of the Kappa Sigma fraternity. He later attended the University of Calgary in order to earn his master's degree.

He taught in Edmonton public schools.

Provincial politics 

Martin ran for a seat in the 1975 Alberta general election in Calgary  and in 1979 in Edmonton-Norwood but both times was unsuccessful.

Martin was elected to the Legislative Assembly of Alberta in the 1982 provincial election to join Grant Notley as part of the two-member Alberta New Democratic Party (NDP) caucus. At the time, they plus two Independent members were the only opposition MLAs sitting in the Legislature, sitting in opposition to more than 70 Conservative MLAs.

He became leader of the Alberta NDP in 1984, succeeding Grant Notley after his death in a plane crash.

Martin led the party to a highwater mark (at the time) winning 16 seats in the 1986 provincial election, making him leader of the opposition in the legislature. Still under Ray's leadership, the NDP took that same number of seats in the 1989 election.

In 1993, none of the party's sitting MLAs were re-elected. Martin was defeated in his constituency, Edmonton-Norwood, by Liberal Andrew Beniuk.

He quit the party's leadership in 1994, being replaced by former NDP MP Ross Harvey

After an absence of eleven years, Martin returned to the Legislature as the NDP Member of the Legislative Assembly (MLA) for Edmonton-Beverly-Clareview in the 2004 general election.

He was defeated in 2008 by Progressive Conservative Tony Vandermeer.

Martin ran again for the NDP in the 2012 provincial election, in the riding of Edmonton-Glenora. He was defeated by Progressive Conservative Heather Klimchuk.

Municipal politics 

In the 2001 Edmonton municipal election, Martin won election as the Edmonton Public School Board Trustee for Ward D.  He did not seek re-election to this role in the 2004 election.

In the 2013 Edmonton municipal election, Martin once again won election as the Edmonton Public School Board Trustee for Ward D.  He did not seek re-election in the 2017 election.

Federal politics 

In 2003, Martin supported Bill Blaikie's unsuccessful campaign to become leader of the federal New Democratic Party.

Ray Martin has run and lost in four federal elections, each time as an NDP candidate.  He ran in the 1997, 2000, 2008, and 2011 federal elections, in Edmonton North, Edmonton Centre-East, and Edmonton East (twice), respectively.

External links

 

Living people
Alberta New Democratic Party MLAs
Alberta CCF/NDP leaders
Alberta school board trustees
New Democratic Party candidates for the Canadian House of Commons
University of Calgary alumni
1941 births
21st-century Canadian politicians